The  superyacht Here Comes The Sun was launched by Amels Holland B.V. at their yard in Vlissingen. The yacht’s exterior is the design work of Tim Heywood who is also behind the entire Amels Limited Editions range. Winch Design was selected by the owner to create the custom interior of Here Comes the Sun that flows across five decks. Originally built to 83m, 'Here Comes The Sun' underwent a six-month refit at Amels shipyard in 2020/21, during which 6 metres was added to her length. 

She is currently the largest yacht built by Amels.

Design 
The hull is built out of steel while the superstructure is made out of aluminium with teak laid decks. The yacht is classed by Lloyd's Register and registered in the Cayman Islands. She is powered by twin Caterpillar 3516 engines, with a total power output 6300 hp.

See also
 List of motor yachts by length
 List of yachts built by Amels BV

References

2016 ships
Motor yachts
Ships built in the Netherlands